King Shiloh is a roots reggae sound system from the Netherlands. According to their profile, they were "founded [...] through the inspiration of Jah Rastafari".

Their first album was released on Haile Selassie I of Ethiopia's birthday, July 23, 1997.

As well as regularly ragging their enormous system at Amsterdam's DubClubY2K, King Shiloh have a show on the city's Radio 100 FM and occasionally appear in the UK. They also play in other countries such as Germany or France.

Members

Jah Rootz
Bredda Neil
Ras Lion
Lyrical Benjie
President Kirky
Billyman
Iyah One
Danny Red

Notes

External links
 

Dutch reggae musical groups
Musical groups from Amsterdam